Indira Nagar  is a residential area in the city of Srinagar in the Indian union territory of Jammu and Kashmir. It used to be a lake before but now only few hundred meters of the lake is left.

This area comes under the control of Badami Bagh Cantonment along with other areas like Batwara, Shivpora and Sonwar Bagh. The cantonment is responsible for maintaining the roads, street lights etc., unlike other areas of Srinagar which are maintained by Srinagar Municipal Corporation.

Kashmiri Pandits, Muslims, Sikhs and Hindus live in the area.

Over the years this area has been commercialised by the construction of many hotels. Indira Nagar is near to G.B Pant Children Hospital. The pincode is 190004.

This area comes in the constituency of Sonwar, for which the MLA is Mohammad Ashraf Mir.

2014 Kashmir Flood
Indira Nagar was one of many areas of Srinagar, including Shivpora, Jawahar Nagar, Rajbagh, Gogji Bagh, Pandrathan, and Batwara, that were worst hit by 2014 Kashmir floods. Indira Nagar was completely submerged for more than 30 days. Many houses were destroyed and damaged due to the floods but only a few were killed. The water started to enter Indira Nagar at about 4:00 am because of a breach in Jhelum River bund. It took it just a few hours to reach a level to completely fill more than one and a half storeys. After the floods people returned to their houses, started to clean up the mess, and returned to routine life again which was now difficult to handle.

Features
Hotels

 Hotel The Grand Plaza
 Hotel Indra
 Hotel Hill View
 Hotel Mountain View
 Hotel Rash Residency
 Hotel Akbar Inn
 Hotel Rotana
 Hotel Gulfam
 Hotel Muskaan
 Hotel Silverine
 Hotel Ground Plaza
 Hotel Fortune Inn
 Heritage Studio Boutique guest House

See also
 Sonwar Bagh
 Lal Chowk
 Badami Bagh

References

Neighbourhoods in Srinagar